Samuel Ingham (September 5, 1793 – November 10, 1881) was a two-term Congressman from Connecticut. He was born in Hebron on September 5, 1793. He attended the common schools in Vermont, studied law with John Mattocks and Sylvester Gilbert, was admitted to the bar and commenced practice in Canaan, Vermont.  He moved to Jewett City, Connecticut and in 1819, to Essex (then part of Saybrook), Connecticut, and continued the practice of his profession.

He served as State's attorney for Middlesex County, and was a member of the Connecticut House of Representatives (serving as speaker in 1833, 1835 and 1851). He served as judge of probate judge of the Middlesex County Court.  Ingham was elected as a Jacksonian to the Twenty-fourth Congress and reelected as a Democrat to the Twenty-fifth Congress (March 4, 1835 – March 3, 1839). He was chairman of the Committee on Naval Affairs (Twenty-fifth Congress). He was defeated for re-election in 1839 to the Twenty-sixth Congress.

He served in the Connecticut Senate in 1842, 1846, and 1850. He served as President pro tempore of the Connecticut Senate and was four times the Democratic nominee for governor of Connecticut (1854–57). Although he finished in first place twice, winning a plurality of more than 10% both times (1854 & 1856), lacking a popular majority, the legislature chose a different candidate.  He was also an unsuccessful Democratic candidate for the United States Senate in 1854. He served as United States commissioner of customs from December 5, 1857, to May 14, 1861, resumed the practice of law, and died in Essex on November 10, 1881. His interment was in River View Cemetery.

His daughter Lydia Ann Ingham was the wife of James Phelps, who also served in Congress. His daughter Mary Wilson Ingham married Edward Champlin Williams, a merchant sea captain.

References

The Political Graveyard

Democratic Party members of the Connecticut House of Representatives
Connecticut lawyers
Connecticut state court judges
1793 births
1881 deaths
Presidents pro tempore of the Connecticut Senate
Democratic Party Connecticut state senators
Democratic Party members of the United States House of Representatives from Connecticut
Jacksonian members of the United States House of Representatives from Connecticut
19th-century American politicians
People from Jewett City, Connecticut
People from Hebron, Connecticut